The General Headquarters (GHQ) is the headquarters of the Pakistan Army and is located within the garrison complex of Rawalpindi, adjacent to the Joint Staff Headquarters.

History 
Following Rawalpindi's capture by the British East India company, 53rd Regiment of the company army took quarters in the newly captured city. The decision to man a permanent military cantonment in the city was made in 1851 by the Marquess of Dalhousie. The city saw its first telegraph office in the early 1850s. The city's Garrison Church was built shortly after in 1854, and is the site where Robert Milman, Bishop of Calcutta, was buried following his death in Rawalpindi in 1876.
It was established on 14 August 1947 in the headquarters of the former Northern Command of the British Indian Army.

In December 2017, it was announced that the Army would be moving to a new GHQ in neighbouring Islamabad.

Command Structure 
General Headquarters is the command center of land forces of Pakistan. In GHQ, there are ten branches commanded by Lt Gen ranked officer, and forty directorates commanded by a Maj Gen ranked officer.

The branches and directorate in GHQ are:
 General Staff, (GS) branch
 Logistic Staff, (LS) branch
 Arms branch
 Adjutant General, (AG) branch
 Training and Evaluation, (T&E) branch
 Quarter Master General (QMG) branch
 Engineer-in-Chief (E-in-C) branch
 Communication and Information Technology (C&IT) branch
 Surgeon General, (SG) branch

General Staff, (GS) branch
 Military Operations, MO Directorate
 Military Intelligence, MI Directorate
 Organisation and Methods, O&M Directorate
 Inspection and Technical Development, I&TD Directorate
 Weapons and Equipment, W&E Directorate

Logistic Staff, (LS) branch
 Logistics Directorate
 National Logistic Cell, NLC
 Supply and Transport, S&T Directorate
 Budget Directorate
 Ordinance Services, OS Directorate
 Electrical and Mechanical Engineering (EME)Directorate
 Aviation Fleet Management (AFM) Dte

Arms branch
 Director General, DG Infantry
 Director General, DG Armoured Corps
 Director General, DG Artillery
 Director General, DG Army Air Defence
 Director General, DG Engineers
 Director General, DG Army Aviation

Adjutant General, (AG) branch
 Law Directorate
 Welfare and Rehabilitation, W&R Directorate
 Pay, Pension and Accounts, PP&A Directorate
 Housing Directorate
 Personal Service, PS Directorate
 Provost Marshal, PM Directorate
 National Guards
 Personal Administration, PA Directorate

Training and Evaluation, (T&E) branch
 Military Training, MT Directorate
 Human Resource Development, HRD Directorate
 Doctrine and Evaluation, D&E Directorate
 Federal Government Education Institutions, FGEI Directorate
 Army Institute of Military History (AIMH), Rawalpindi
 Army Sports Directorate (AS Dte)
 Pakistan Military Academy, Kakul, Abbottabad
 Pakistan Command and Staff College, Quetta

Quarter Master General (QMG) branch
 Quartering and Lands, Q&L Directorate
 Military Lands and Cantonment (Ml&c) Directorate
 Remount, Veterinary, and Farms Corps Directorate - as of 2003, oversaw Okara Military Farms and 23 other military farms.
 Army Heritage Foundation (AHF)

Engineer-in-Chief (E-in-C) branch
 Frontier Works Organization 
 45 Engineers Division, Rawalpindi
 Military Engineer Services (MES)

Communication and Information Technology (C&IT) branch
 Command, Control, Communication, Computer and Intelligence, (C4I) Directorate
 Signals Directorate

Surgeon General, (SG) branch
 Medical Directorate
 Medical Services Azad Kashmir, MS AK
 Medical Services Navy, MS N

See also
 Joint Staff Headquarters (Pakistan)
 Air Headquarters (Pakistan Air Force)
 Naval Headquarters (Pakistan Navy)
 Pakistan Armed Forces
 Operation Janbaz

References 

Rawalpindi District
1947 establishments in Pakistan
Military headquarters in Pakistan
National army headquarters